Leutnant Richard Wenzl was a German World War I flying ace credited with twelve aerial victories.

World War I service
Wenzl flew first for an artillery cooperation unit, FAA 236. He transferred, first to KEK Ost, then to Jagdstaffel 31 in the spring of 1917. For his first victory, he shot down and destroyed a Spad on 19 April 1917. He had an unconfirmed claim the following month. He would not score again for a year, after he had switched into Jagdstaffel 11 on 27 March 1918. After his second victory, on 16 May, he transferred to Jagdstaffel 6 the next day. He began a five-month scoring streak on 5 June, running his total to 11 destroyed enemy aircraft and an observation balloon on 5 November 1918. Wenzl also served as the squadron's acting commander from 10 August to 9 September 1918.

In the early Autumn of 1918, Wenzl met Ernst Jünger while in an infirmary in Hanover. Jünger described Wenzl as "one of the tall and fearless types our nation still produces. He lived up to the motto of his squadron, 'Hard - and crazy with it!' and had already brought down a dozen opponents in single combat, although the last had splintered his upper arm with a bullet first."

Victory list

Confirmed victories are numbered; unconfirmed claims are denoted as U/C.

Sources of information

References
 Above the Lines: The Aces and Fighter Units of the German Air Service, Naval Air Service and Flanders Marine Corps 1914 - 1918 Norman L. R. Franks, et al. Grub Street, 1993. , .

1957 deaths
Year of birth missing
German World War I flying aces
Recipients of the Iron Cross (1914), 1st class